Malcolm Partridge (born 28 August 1950 in Calow, Derbyshire, England), is an English footballer who played as a forward in the Football League.

Personal life 
Partridge's son, Scott, was also a professional footballer.

References

External links
 

1950 births
Living people
English footballers
Association football forwards
Charlton Athletic F.C. players
Leicester City F.C. players
Mansfield Town F.C. players
Grimsby Town F.C. players
Scunthorpe United F.C. players
English Football League players
People from Calow
Footballers from Derbyshire